Sanjay Baburao Bansode (born 31 December 1973) is an Indian politician from Nationalist Congress Party, who was the cabinet minister of the Maharashtra from 30 December 2019 to 29 June 2022. He is a member of Nationalist Congress Party from Latur district.

He became member of Maharashtra Legislative Assembly by defeating Dr.Anil Kamble of Bharatiya Janata Party in 2019 Maharashtra Legislative Assembly election. He had participated in Namantar movement.

Personal life 
Bansode belongs to an Ambedkarite Buddhist family.

After completing matriculation in Latur, Bansode completed graduation from Deogiri College, Aurangabad.

Political career

Early career

Bansode was known as student loving leader since he showed his leadership in college. In same time, he started to work for National Students' Union of India. He joined Indian National Congress in 1992. He was regional vice-president of Indian Youth Congress. During Namantar movement, he traveled in Marathwada with Nationalist Congress Party president Sharad Pawar.

He became executive president of NCP for Latur district when NCP founded in 1999. Since then he worked as regional secretary. He also worked as district president of Mahatma Phule Equality Council.

Elections

Bansode was defeated in triad battle to Sudhakar Bhalerao in 2014 Maharashtra Legislative Assembly election. He worked for five years in the constituency. Udgir constituency is a strong point for BJP, where NCP had only one district councillor and two Panchayat committee members.

He won 2019 Maharashtra Legislative Assembly election by defeating incumbent Dr. Anil Kamble with margin of 20,000 votes. Udgir constituency got minister after 35 years. Before Bansode, Udgir (Vidhan Sabha constituency) had a state minister Balasaheb Jadhav in 1984 to '86.

Positions held 
• 1992–1999: Regional vice-president of Youth Congress and member of Indian National Congress

• 1999–2019:  Regional Secretary of Nationalist Congress Party

• 2019–present: Member Of Maharashtra Legislative Assembly

• 2019–2022: Minister of state for environment, water supply and sanitation, public works, employment guarantee, earthquake rehabilitation and parliamentary affairs; Government of Maharashtra

See also 
• Udgir (Vidhan Sabha constituency)

References 

Living people
1973 births
Marathi politicians
Nationalist Congress Party politicians from Maharashtra
Indian Buddhists
20th-century Buddhists
21st-century Buddhists
People from Latur district
People from Marathwada
Maharashtra MLAs 2019–2024